Invisible Records is a Chicago based record label founded by Martin Atkins. In 2001, Invisible Records started a subsidiary label Underground Inc.

Roster

References

External links
 Official Site

American independent record labels
Industrial record labels
Goth record labels